Brendan Markey (born 19 May 1976, in Dublin) was an Irish soccer player who plays for Bangor Celtic in the Leinster Senior League.

A nippy striker, he started his career with Bohemians, where he scored at Helsingin Jalkapalloklubi in a 1995 UEFA Intertoto Cup tie.

In December 1995 he was snapped up for £60,000 by Mick McCarthy at Millwall. However his time in London was marred by injury and he did not play a single first team game for the Lions. He was loaned out to Dundalk F.C. in November 1996.

He signed for Shamrock Rovers for the 1998-99 League of Ireland season. His only goal came at Oriel Park on 25 February.

He then moved to Waterford United where he scored in just one game all season on 27 December 1999, a hat trick against St Pats. There were further spells at Bohemians again, Monaghan United, St Patrick's Athletic, Athlone Town, Newry Town and Glenavon F.C.

References

1976 births
Living people
Republic of Ireland association footballers
Association football forwards
League of Ireland players
Bohemian F.C. players
Millwall F.C. players
Shamrock Rovers F.C. players
Dundalk F.C. players
St Patrick's Athletic F.C. players
Waterford F.C. players
Monaghan United F.C. players
Athlone Town A.F.C. players
Newry City F.C. players
Glenavon F.C. players
NIFL Premiership players
Cherry Orchard F.C. players
Leinster Senior League (association football) players